Wallenius Lines is a privately owned Swedish shipping company. The company was founded in 1934 by Olof Wallenius. Wallenius Lines is an investor and active owner within the global shipping industry, specifically the international car and roll-on/roll-off segment.

Wallenius Lines is fully owned by Rederi AB Soya and part of the Soya Group.

History 
In the 1960s, Wallenius pioneered the RoRo concept, first on the North Atlantic trade and later on the Asian trade when Wallenius became the first independent shipping line to work with Japan’s automobile manufacturing industry.

See also
Wallenius Wilhelmsen Logistics
Wallenius Marine
Wilh. Wilhelmsen
American Roll-on Roll-off Carrier
EUKOR
United European Car Carriers
Nippon Yusen Kaisha

References

External links
 

Shipping companies of Sweden
Car carrier shipping companies
Ro-ro shipping companies